State Highway 32 (SH 32) is a State Highway in Kerala, India that starts in Athirampuzha and ends in Poonjar. The highway is 37.9 km long.

The Route Map 
Athirampuzha landing - SH-1 crosses - Ettumanoor - Kidangoor - Cherpunkal - Mutholy - SH-03 crosses and overlaps - Pala Market - Bharananganam town - Erattupetta town - Poonjar.

See also 
Roads in Kerala
List of State Highways in Kerala

References 

State Highways in Kerala
Roads in Kottayam district